The 2020-21 Minnesota Duluth Bulldogs men's ice hockey season was the 77th season of play for the program and the 8th in the NCHC conference. The Bulldogs represented the University of Minnesota Duluth and were coached by Scott Sandelin, in his 21st season.

Season
As a result of the ongoing COVID-19 pandemic the entire college ice hockey season was delayed. Because the NCAA had previously announced that all winter sports athletes would retain whatever eligibility they possessed through at least the following year, none of Minnesota Duluth's players would lose a season of play. However, the NCAA also approved a change in its transfer regulations that would allow players to transfer and play immediately rather than having to sit out a season, as the rules previously required.

Along with the rest of the NCHC, Minnesota Duluth began the year in Omaha, Nebraska. Duluth was forced to replace not only the best goaltender in the history of the program, Hunter Shepard, but three standout defensemen, including Hobey Baker Award-winning Scott Perunovich. Despite the talent drain, UMD started the season hot, going undefeated in their first 6 games. The team ran into a bit of trouble in the third week of December but still entered January ranked in the top-5. The Bulldogs began 2021 with 4 consecutive games against St. Cloud State and after winning the first match, dropped three straight to the Huskies. All of the games were close but the bad run allowed freshman Zach Stejskal to get a few turns in the starting role. Duluth recovered with three weeks against bad teams, winning 6 consecutive games, but was stymied by Western Michigan and limped to the end of the regular season. UMD ended up getting passed by St. Cloud in the final game and ended up 3rd in the conference.

The result of their finish was a meeting with Western Michigan in the conference tournament, and Minnesota Duluth had to overcome two separate leads by the Broncos to take the game in overtime. In the semifinal they faced St. Cloud State for the 7th time that season (1/4 of their games) and could never quite impose their will on the Huskies. UMD tied the game twice but the Bulldogs couldn't overcome St. Cloud's 3rd goal and fell in the semifinals. Fortunately, UMD was ranked in the top-10 and was essentially guaranteed a spot in the NCAA Tournament.

Minnesota Duluth was ranked 9th by the selection committee and given a #3 seed. They were placed opposite Michigan but COVID-19 prevented their meeting. Due to Michigan's withdrawal, UMD's first tournament game would be against top-seeded North Dakota and the two ended up producing a game for the ages. UMD started Stejskal in goal and the plan looked to be the perfect choice early; Stejskal turned aside every UND shot in the first two periods and allowed the Bulldogs to take a 2-goal lead early in the third. North Dakota pulled their goalie with more than 2 minutes to play, trying to jump-start their offense and, miraculously, the tactic worked. The Fighting Hawks scored twice in the final 100 seconds and tied the game. The two teams continued to battle into overtime and UMD scored in the extra frame, only to see the goal waved-off due to offsides. More than 40 minutes later, UND almost ended the game when the puck hit Stejskal in the shoulder, deflected up and landed on top of the goal. In the 4th overtime, it looked like North Dakota had caught a break when Stejskal had to leave the game due to cramping but, fortunately for UMD, Ryan Fanti was more than capable of holding the fort. It took another period before the game finally saw the winning goal and freshman Luke Mylymok ended the match with just his second career goal. This was the longest game in the history of the NCAA tournament but was still more than 27 minutes shorter than the longest contest in NCAA history.

The win sent Minnesota Duluth into the Frozen Four for the 4th consecutive season (not counting the cancelled 2020 Tournament) and were joined by two other Minnesota teams. In the national semifinal, UMD faced Massachusetts in a rematch of the 2019 championship. Before the game began, UMD lost the serviced of Fanti due to COVID protocols but UMass would be without 4 players, including their starting goaltender and leading goal-scorer. Despite the disadvantage, the Minutemen hung in the game, keeping the score close while being outshout 36–15 in regulation. UMD was unable to get much past Matt Murray and had to settle for another overtime game with the score knotted at two apiece. In the extra session, Massachusetts came alive and skated rings around the Bulldogs. UMass fired 13 shots on goal, to UMD's 2 and were control most of the overtime. When Garrett Wait netted the winning goal it not only ended the Bulldogs' season but their 9-game winning streak in NCAA overtime games that stretched back to 1985.

Brady Meyer and Ben Patt sat out the season.

Departures

Recruiting

Roster
As of March 1, 2021.

Standings

Schedule and results

|-
!colspan=12 style=";" | Regular season

|-
!colspan=12 style=";" | 

|-
!colspan=12 style=";" | 
|- style="background:#bbbbbb"
| March 26
| 3:00 PM
| vs. #8 Michigan
| align=center|#9
| Scheels Arena • Fargo, North Dakota (Regional semifinals)
| ESPNU
| colspan=5 rowspan=1 style="text-align:center"|Cancelled due to COVID-19 protocols

Scoring statistics

Goaltending statistics

Rankings

USCHO did not release a poll in week 20.

Awards and honors

Players drafted into the NHL

2021 NHL Entry Draft

† incoming freshman

References

Minnesota Duluth Bulldogs men's ice hockey seasons
Minnesota Duluth
Minnesota Duluth
Minnesota Duluth
Minnesota Duluth
Minnesota Duluth
Minnesota Duluth